A data deficient (DD) species is one which has been categorized by the International Union for Conservation of Nature (IUCN) as offering insufficient information for a proper assessment of conservation status to be made. This does not necessarily indicate that the species has not been extensively studied; but it does indicate that little or no information is available on the abundance and distribution of the species.

The IUCN recommends that care be taken to avoid classing species as "data deficient" when the absence of records may indicate dangerously low abundance: "If the range of a taxon is suspected to be relatively circumscribed, if a considerable period of time has elapsed since the last record of the taxon, threatened status may well be justified" (see also precautionary principle).

See also
 IUCN Red List data deficient species
 List of data deficient amphibians
 IUCN Red List data deficient species (Annelida)
 List of data deficient arthropods
 List of data deficient birds
 IUCN Red List data deficient species (Cnidaria)
 List of data deficient fishes
 List of data deficient insects
 List of data deficient invertebrates
 List of data deficient mammals
 List of data deficient molluscs
 List of data deficient plants
 List of data deficient reptiles

References

External links 
 

 
IUCN Red List
Biota by conservation status